The Tarkhan is a large Clan commonly found in the Punjab regions of India and Pakistan. They are traditionally carpenters by occupation.

The Hindu members of this clan are generally identified as Khatis, Suthars or Lohars following the Vishwakarma community of India.
Whereas, Tarkhan Sikhs are among those groups who are identified as Ramgarhias, after the Misl leader Jassa Singh Ramgarhia.

According to the 1921 census of India, some Tarkhan Sikh families also owned and tilled their own land, with some owning large areas of land and, in some cases, whole villages.  Despite Sikhism generally rejecting the caste system, it does have its own very similar socio-economic hierarchy and in that the Ramgarhias, of which the Tarkhans are a part, tend to traditionally marry within their own community. 

During the latter of 18th century and early 1900's the community in general were able to elevate in social-status due to their ancestorial trade and expertise in carpentry being sought after by the British Raj during their reign in India where they were paid to help in the construction of buildings and infrastructure in major cities across the country which allowed some members of the community to earn more money than they traditionally would have working in the villages of Punjab.

During Britain's reign in India, they actively recruited those from the Tarkhan community to work in construction and enabled many to travel to countries within the British Empire, mainly former British colonies such as Uganda, Kenya and Tanzania where there still remains a population of Tarkhan's today as well as those from the Gujrati community. Some helped build infrastructure such as the Uganda Railway and worked freely as citizens of the Commonwealth of Nations and later went onto become prominent figures in business and politics. During the 1960's and 1970's, especially during Expulsion of Asians from Uganda much of the community moved out of East Africa and settled in the United Kingdom as they were given British citizenship as members of the Commonwealth of Nations.

Tarkhan Sikh's make up less than 10% of the Sikh population worldwide. Many Tarkhan Sikh's maintain a traditional Sikh appearance, where males wear a turban, known as a dastar and practice keeping their hair uncut, known as Kesh (Sikhism). Many Sikh Tarkhan's have been practicing the religion since the time of the founding leader, Guru Nanak, as one of his first followers, Bhai Lalo was from the a carpenter from the Tarkhan clan.  

In 2001, the Punjab Government included Ramgarhia, Tarkhan and Dhiman in the list of Other Backward Classes (OBC) to improve their economic conditions. They were also added in the list of backward classes by the governments of Haryana and Himachal Pradesh.

Notable people
Jassa Singh Ramgarhia, commander of the Ramgarhia Misl

Bhai Lalo, one of Guru Nanak's first devotees 

Zail Singh, served as the seventh president of India

Makhan Singh (Kenyan trade unionist), a political activist

Harbhajan Singh, Indian retired cricketer

Monty Panesar, English cricketer

Joginder Singh (rally driver), professional rally driver

Amar Virdi, English cricketer

Bally Sagoo, British record-producer

Suzanne Virdee, British journalist and television presenter

Peter Virdee, businessman and property tycoon

References

Punjabi tribes
Carpenter castes